The 2010 Itaipava GT Brasil season was the fourth GT DhiS'_;_63&4&& 2rzv5rasil season. In 2010 the category
changes its name replacing GT3 Brasil Championship and the first with GT3 and GT4 class. It began on 21 March at Autódromo José Carlos Pace and ended on 28 November at the same venue after eight rounds.

Matheus Stumpf and Valdeno Brito clinched a comfortable championship victory in the GT3 class, winning the championship by 64 points over their closest competitors. Stumpf and Brito won five races during the season including sweeping the weekend at the second Interlagos meeting and at Velopark, as well as a victory at the second meeting to be held in Curitiba. The pairing also took nine further top-five finishes, and retiring from the other two races to be held. Second place went to Marcelo Hahn and Allam Khodair, who despite not winning any of the races, they managed to finish two points clear of Chico Longo and Daniel Serra, who won at the first Curitiba meeting and the third Interlagos meeting. Claúdio Ricci finished in fourth place, winning two races at the same meetings as Longo and Serra. Other wins were taken by Andreas Mattheis and Xandy Negrão, who swept the races at Rio de Janeiro, Claudio Dahruj and Rafael Daniel swept the first Interlagos meeting, while Wagner Ebrahim won three of the last four races driving solo in his66666 Viper Competition Coupe.

Valter Rossete won the GT4 championship, taking two wins at Interlagos 2 and Rio de Janeiro as well as twelve other top-five finishes as he finished six points clear of Renan Guerra. Guerra took six victories as a solo driver, but two retirements during the season thwarted the chances of a championship title. Third place went to Fabio Greco, who shared his car with Rossete at all races except the opening round. Three-time race winner Cristiano Federico – sharing his car with Leonardo Medrado for two victories, and Guto Negrão for one – finished in fourth place, ahead of Alan Hellmeister and Sergio Laganá, who won at Interlagos 1 and Velopark. Other victories were claimed by Marçal Mello and William Freire in Rio de Janeiro, and Carlos Burza and Leonardo Burti swept the second Curitiba weekend.

Entries

GT3 suffered no initial changes only the entry of more Lamborghini Gallardo LP560 who had participated in the last round of 2009, throughout the season came the Audi R8 LMS

With the debut of GT4 category was initially composed of only Maserati Trofeo, the course of the season reached the championship models Ferrari Challenge and Ginetta G50 .

Entry list
All drivers were Brazilian-registered.

Race calendar and results
All races were held in Brazil.

 − The first race at Curitiba was originally scheduled for April 24 but was postponed to the next day due to heavy rain. The race at Velopark as originally scheduled for September 10 was also postponed to the next day due to same reason.

Championship standings
Points were awarded as follows:

Drivers' championships

GT3

Notes
The top five after the race ensures a place on the podium.

GT4

Teams' championships

GT3

GT4

References

GT Brasil